Amina Kajtaz (born 31 December 1996) is a Croatian swimmer. Prior to 2022, she represented Bosnia and Herzegovina. Kajtaz competed in the women's 100 metre butterfly event at the 2016 Summer Olympics. She is the daughter of Bosnian former footballer Sead Kajtaz.

Results

Individual

Long course

Short course

Relay

Short course

Personal bests

This list include only above 750 Swimming points time.

References

External links
 

1996 births
Living people
Croatian people of Bosniak descent
Bosnia and Herzegovina female swimmers
Croatian female swimmers
Olympic swimmers of Bosnia and Herzegovina
Swimmers at the 2016 Summer Olympics
Swimmers at the 2018 Mediterranean Games
Sportspeople from Mostar
Sportspeople from Nuremberg
Female butterfly swimmers
Mediterranean Games competitors for Bosnia and Herzegovina
Female backstroke swimmers